Julius (born 26 December 1979) is a chimpanzee at Kristiansand Zoo and Amusement Park in Norway. As a baby, Julius was rejected by his mother, and was eventually adopted by the family of Edvard Moseid, the director of the zoo. The baby chimpanzee became the subject of a children's documentary on the Norwegian Broadcasting Corporation in 1981, and was soon the park's most popular attraction.

As Julius grew older and became more aggressive, attempts were made to reintegrate him with the flock. First attempts were unsuccessful, and Julius had to be isolated. The Zoo subsequently decided to build a separate facility so that Julius could live on his own, separated from the rest of the chimpanzees held at the Zoo. Over the years, Julius was partnered with a number of female chimpanzees, which resulted in the birth of his sons Julius Jr. in 2003 and Linus in 2005 by two different females. Julius would continue to live separated from the main social group until the leader of the group, Champis, died in 2005. Julius was once more admitted with the others, and although there were initial difficulties, he successfully managed to take the role as the group's new leader.

Reunited with the group 
Julius has remained the leader of the group of chimpanzees held at the Zoo since 2005. He became a father for the third time when his daughter Yr was born in 2011; the following year, Linus died at the age of 5, after falling into a water ditch surrounding the outdoors enclosure. In 2019, a DNA-test confirmed that Julius belongs to a sub-group of chimpanzees, the West-African Chimpanzees. As a result of this, in the future, the Zoo hopes that Julius' social group may be strengthened with an additional one or two females of the same sub-group, and that Julius may father further offspring that can integrated into conservation programs in the efforts to conserve the species.

See also
 List of individual apes

References 

Individual chimpanzees
1979 animal births
Kristiansand Zoo and Amusement Park
Individual animals in Norway